Bror Modén is a retired Swedish bandy player. Modén was part of the Djurgården Swedish champions' team of 1908.

References

Swedish bandy players
Djurgårdens IF Bandy players